Webbtown is an unincorporated community in Clarke County in the U.S. state of Virginia. Webbtown lies to the east of Berryville on Harry Byrd Highway (Virginia State Route 7) at its intersection with Wickliffe Road (VA 608).

Unincorporated communities in Clarke County, Virginia
Unincorporated communities in Virginia